Titanio metaxanthalis is a moth in the family Crambidae. It was described by George Hampson in 1900. It is found in the Tian Shan mountains in Central Asia.

References

Moths described in 1900
Odontiini
Taxa named by George Hampson